The 1954 Michigan gubernatorial election took place on November 2, 1954, to elect the governor of Michigan.

Results

Primaries 
The primary elections occurred on August 3, 1954.

Democratic primary

Republican primary

References

External links
 Republican primary results

1954
gubernatorial
Michigan
November 1954 events in the United States